WKKL (90.7 FM) is a radio station  broadcasting a classic alternative format. Licensed to West Barnstable, Massachusetts, United States, the station serves the Cape Cod area.  The station is owned by Cape Cod Community College.  The station is used as part of the classroom setting for their Associate degree program in communications. The studios are located on the campus of Cape Cod Community College in the Makkay Broadcast Center. WKKL's format is college alternative, with a wide variety of diverse student programming. For many years, WKKL simulcast some hours of programming from Boston public radio station WBUR from 1992. That relationship ended in 1999, due to WBUR's 1997 acquisition of the 1240 AM frequency in West Yarmouth, the signal of which heavily overlaps with WKKL. WKKL is proud to broadcast its student-driven programming 24 hours a day, 7 days a week.

In late December 2019, WKKL stopped broadcasting on 90.7 FM due to damage to the station's radio tower. In fall of 2020, repair of the radio tower was made possible by a generous donation from the Cape Cod Community College Educational Foundation, and the station returned to the airwaves by late December 2020. Today, the station provides programming on air and online as students and alumni djs are hosting shows featuring WKKL's Classic Alternative music format as well as a growing number of podcasts.

References

External links

Barnstable, Massachusetts
KKL
KKL
Radio stations established in 1977
1977 establishments in Massachusetts
Cape Cod Community College